Maireana brevifolia is a shrub that is native to Australia and naturalised in South Africa, the Middle East and the Canary Islands. Common names in Australia include cotton bush, eastern cotton-bush,  short-leaf bluebush, small-leaf bluebush and yanga bush. It grows to between 0.2 and 1 metre high. The flower-like fruits are up to 9 mm in diameter and comprise 5 paper-thin wings. It is one of the first species to appear in disturbed saline habitats.

It has been used as a dry-season fodder plant in South Africa and Namibia where it is known as Australian bluebush.

References

brevifolia
Flora of New South Wales
Flora of Queensland
Flora of the Northern Territory
Flora of South Australia
Flora of Victoria (Australia)
Flora of Namibia
Eudicots of Western Australia